The Amapa River is a river of Oaxaca and Veracruz states of Mexico.

The river originates in the foothills of the Sierra Madre de Oaxaca in Veracruz. It flows southeastwards, forming the border between Oaxaca and Veracruz, before emptying into the Tonto River, a tributary of the Papaloapan.

See also
List of rivers of Mexico

References

The Prentice Hall American World Atlas, 1984.
Rand McNally, The New International Atlas, 1993.

Rivers of Oaxaca
Rivers of Veracruz
Papaloapan River